Sofia Rosinsky (born June 10, 2006) is an American actress, who began her career as a child actress.

Personal life
Rosinsky's mother is actress K. Louise Middleton, studied with acting coach Sanford Meisner. She began acting at age five.

Career
Rosinsky is known for her role in the 2022 Amazon Prime series "Paper Girls" portraying Mackenzie "Mac" Coyle. She is also known for the 2016 horror film The Other Side of the Door, for which she won a Young Artist Award, as well as a Young Entertainer Award for Best Performance in a Feature Film – Leading Young Actress. She was awarded best actress for the 48 Hour Film Project film, Zoe and the Prince. In 2018, Rosinsky won the "Breakthrough Director" award from the Hollywood Reel Independent Film Festival for the short film Faery.

In 2019, Rosinsky played Zora Morris in the Disney Channel television series Fast Layne. In April 2021, she was cast in a co-leading role of Mac Coyle on the Amazon Prime Video science-fiction television series Paper Girls, which was released in July 2022.

Filmography

Awards and nominations

References

External links

2006 births
21st-century American actresses
Actresses from Los Angeles
American film actresses
American television actresses
Living people